Ross Paul Davenport (born 23 May 1984) is an English competitive swimmer who has represented Great Britain in the Olympics, world and European championships, and swam for England in the Commonwealth Games.  He won two gold medals in the 2006 Commonwealth Games in Melbourne for the 200-metre freestyle and the 4×200-metre freestyle relay.

On Monday, 27 November 2006 he was recognized as the BBC East Midlands Sports Personality of the Year.  He was a member of the University of Bath swimming club, coached by Ian Turner and trains at Loughborough University.  Born in Belper, Derbyshire, he now lives and trains in Loughborough.

Ross qualified for Team GB at the 2008 Beijing Olympics in two events, the 200-metre freestyle and the 4×200-metre freestyle relay. He achieved this by winning the 200-metre freestyle, ahead of Robert Renwick, in the 2008 Long Course British Championships (incorporating the Olympic trials) on 3 April. His time in the final was 1:47.66.

He was part of the British 4x200-metre freestyle relay team at the 2012 Summer Olympics.

He started at Belper School in 1995.

References

External links
British Swimming athlete profile
British Olympic Association athlete profile

1984 births
Living people
Commonwealth Games gold medallists for England
Commonwealth Games medallists in swimming
Commonwealth Games silver medallists for England
English male freestyle swimmers
European Aquatics Championships medalists in swimming
Medalists at the 2003 Summer Universiade
Medalists at the 2005 Summer Universiade
Medalists at the FINA World Swimming Championships (25 m)
Olympic swimmers of Great Britain
People from Belper
Sportspeople from Derbyshire
Swimmers at the 2004 Summer Olympics
Swimmers at the 2006 Commonwealth Games
Swimmers at the 2008 Summer Olympics
Swimmers at the 2012 Summer Olympics
Universiade bronze medalists for Great Britain
Universiade gold medalists for Great Britain
Universiade medalists in swimming
Universiade silver medalists for Great Britain
Medallists at the 2006 Commonwealth Games